Shin Kong Place is a mall located at the intersection of Suzhou Dadao Dong and Huachi Jie in Suzhou's China–Singapore Suzhou Industrial Park, in China.

References

Commercial buildings in Suzhou
Suzhou Industrial Park